"Hamsa Naava" is a Telugu song from the 2017 film Baahubali 2: The Conclusion. Sung by Sony and Deepu, the song's lyrics were penned by Chaitanya Prasad and its music was composed by M.M. Keeravani. The music video of the track features Prabhas as Amarendra Baahubali and Anushka Shetty as Devasena in a romantic duet on a flying ship, with Devasena expressing her feelings for Amarendra Baahubali. The theme, title and idea of the song was given by the film's director S.S. Rajamouli.

Release
The audio of the song was released on 26 March 2017 along with other tracks in the album through the YouTube channel of T-Series Telugu. The music video of the song  released on 20 July 2017. The audio of the song has received more than 40 million views on YouTube.

The song was released in Tamil as Orey Oar Ooril on 9 April 2017, in Hindi as Veeron Ke Veer Aa on 5 April 2017 and in Malayalam as Ore Oru Raja on 24 April 2017.

Reception
Firstpost writes, "An instantly catchy song, sung by Sony and Deepu, has lyrics written by Chaitanya Prasad. The musical arrangement throughout the song sounds perfect for a romantic duet in a period drama like Baahubali."

Accolades

References

Baahubali (franchise)
Songs with music by M. M. Keeravani
Macaronic songs
Telugu film songs
2017 songs
Indian songs
Songs written for films